Adolfo Alsina is a western partido of the Buenos Aires Province, Argentina, found at coordinates .

It has a population of 16,245, an area of 5,875 km2 (2,268 sq mi), and the capital is Carhué.

History
Adolfo Alsina Partido was founded on January 21, 1877.

Demographics

Towns
Carhué (8,584 inhabitants)
Arano
Arturo Vatteone
Canónigo Gorriti
Delfín Huergo (37 inhabitants)
Esteban A. Gascón (100 inhabitants)
San Miguel Arcángel (649 inhabitants)
Los Gauchos
Villa Maza (1,705 inhabitants)
Murature
Rivera (3,016 inhabitants)
Thames (25 inhabitants)
Tres Lagunas
Yutuyaco (19 inhabitants)
Avestruz
La Pala (25 inhabitants)
Espartillar
Villa Margarita
Colonia Lapin
Leubucó

References

External links
 Official Website
 Ministry of the Interior statistics

 
Partidos of Buenos Aires Province